Sir William Herbert Greaves was chief justice of Barbados. He was knighted in 1904.

References 

Year of birth missing
Year of death missing
Knights Bachelor
Barbadian judges
Solicitors General of Barbados
Alumni of St Edmund Hall, Oxford
Members of the Middle Temple
Barbadian lawyers